Sandy Burns was a comedian. He toured on the T.O.B.A. circuit.

Burns led the Sandy Burns Stock Company. He was married to fellow performer Gretchen Burns.

He was born in Oklahoma City, Oklahoma and grew up in Huntsville, Texas.

He performed with Ferdinand “Jelly-Roll” Morton. He performed with Sam “Bill” Russell.

Quintart Miller met his future performing partner Marcus Slayter when both were part of the Burns’ stock company.

Shows
The Hunter Hors (1919)
Hello Sue (1921)
Hot Rhythm (1932)

Filmography
His Great Chance (1923)
The Brand of Cain (1935)

References

American male comedians
Year of birth missing (living people)
Living people